The AN/VRC-12 is the lowest-numbered element of a family of vehicular VHF-FM synthesized vehicular radio communications systems developed by Avco Corporation and introduced around 1963 and used extensively by the U.S. military during the Vietnam War and for many years after. It replaced the earlier AN/GRC-3 through 8 series and was, in turn, replaced by the Single Channel Ground and Airborne Radio System (SINCGARS) in the early 1990s. The sets were manufactured by its original developer, Avco based in Cincinnati, Oh (originally by its Electronic & Ordnance Div., Evendale, Ohio), and Magnavox, Ft. Wayne, Indiana (with LTV Electrosystems, Inc. and Memcor, Inc., supplying certain components, such as receivers and transmitters.) Texas Instruments was one of the principal bidders that proposed improved, ultra-reliable (failure-free) variant of VRC-12 in the late 1960s, but failed to win the competition. RCA bid for ultra-reliable variant in the early 1970s was also unsuccessful.

Background
The older AN/GRC-3 to 8 series was configured from three different transceivers:

The RT-66/GRC covered the armor band 20 MHz - 27.9 MHz
The RT-67/GRC covered the artillery band 27 MHz - 38.9 MHz
 The  RT-68/GRC covered the infantry band 38 MHz - 54.9 MHz

Each transceiver weighed 215 lb and occupied 2.5 cubic feet. Power output was 15 to 20 Watts, yielding a 15-mile range. Frequency spacing was 100 kHz. There was limited overlap between armor and artillery radios, and between artillery and infantry radios, but none between armor and infantry. 

The transceivers in the new AN/VRC-12 series were half the size and weight of the GRC-3x series, output twice the power, yet covered all frequencies in the larger 30 to 76 MHz FM band and provided 920 channels, vs 350 with the GRC-3 series.

Technical details
The VRC-12 series includes the VRC-12 and VRC-43 to 49. which consist of various combinations of three basic components, two receiver-transmitter models, the RT-246 and the RT-524, and an auxiliary receiver, the R-442. The RT-246 can select one of ten frequencies preset by the operator. The operator has to select each frequency manually on the RT-524, which has a built-in loudspeaker in the space occupied by push buttons on the RT-246. The RT-524 was developed primarily for use in vehicles where the operator could reach the control panel easily; the RT-246 was designed for use in tracked vehicles where the operator could not reach the control panel. In Vietnam these radios were often removed from vehicles for use in bases such as forward tactical command posts. In most cases, major tactical units were issued the VRC-12 family of radios just before or shortly after their deployment to Vietnam during 1965 and 1966.

The radios contained 100 transistors and 8 vacuum tubes and were modular in design, allowing most servicing to be done with only a screw driver. Later upgrades replaced the vacuum tubes with transistors. A variety of accessories were available, including antennas, control heads, encryptors, head sets, shock mounts, speakers and interconnecting cables.

See also
 List of military electronics of the United States
 AN/PRC-77 manpack radio that interoperated with the VRC-12

References

External links
 AN/VRC-12 Vehicular Tactical Radio Sets Olive-drab.com
VRC-12 page at Radio Nerds

Military radio systems of the United States
Military electronics of the United States
Military equipment of the Vietnam War
Military equipment introduced in the 1960s